Alejandro "Álex" Pachón Parraga (born 17 July 2000) is a Spanish professional footballer who plays for UD Las Palmas Atlético as a forward.

Club career
Born in Vilafranca del Penedès, Barcelona, Catalonia, Pachón joined Girona FC's youth setup in 2017, from Club Gimnàstic Manresa. He made his senior debut with farm team CF Peralada-Girona B on 26 August 2017, coming on as a second-half substitute for Maximiliano Villa in a 1–4 Segunda División B loss against Valencia CF Mestalla.

Pachón scored his first senior goal on 23 September 2018, netting the equalizer in a 2–2 home draw against CD Atlético Baleares. He made his professional debut the following 31 January, replacing fellow youth graduate Paik Seung-ho in a 1–3 home defeat to Real Madrid, for the season's Copa del Rey; he also assisted Pedro Porro's goal.

On 14 August 2019, Pachón was loaned to third division newcomers FC Andorra for one year. The following 17 January, he moved to fellow league team AE Prat, also in a temporary deal.

References

External links

2000 births
Living people
People from Vilafranca del Penedès
Sportspeople from the Province of Barcelona
Spanish footballers
Footballers from Catalonia
Association football forwards
Segunda División players
Segunda División B players
Segunda Federación players
Tercera División players
CF Peralada players
Girona FC players
FC Andorra players
AE Prat players
Girona FC B players
UD Las Palmas Atlético players
Spanish expatriate footballers
Expatriate footballers in Andorra
Spanish expatriate sportspeople in Andorra